Tinglev is a town with a population of 2,731 (1 January 2022) in Aabenraa Municipality in Region of Southern Denmark on the Jutland peninsula in south Denmark. Tinglev is a base for German minority institutions in Southern Jutland, the minority Schleswig Party receiving 18.0% of the town's vote in the municipal elections of 2021.

From 1866 until 1920, Tinglev was part of the Prussian Province of Schleswig-Holstein, and formed a part of Imperial Germany.  Notable figures born there include Hjalmar Schacht, a liberal economist who introduced a wide variety of schemes in Germany before and during The Third Reich in order to tackle the effects that the Great Depression had on that country, and was a key player in Nazi Germany's economic steps towards re-armament.

Tinglev Municipality

Until 1 January 2007, Tinglev was also a municipality (Danish: kommune) in the former South Jutland County. Its last mayor was Susanne Beier, a member of the Venstre (Liberal Party) political party.

 Bjolderup Parish
 Burkal Parish
 Bylderup Parish
 Ravsted Parish
 Tinglev Parish
 Uge Parish

Tinglev municipality ceased to exist as the result of the Kommunalreformen ("The Municipality Reform" of 2007). It was merged with Bov, Lundtoft,  Rødekro, and Aabenraa municipalities to form the new Aabenraa Municipality.

Notable people 

 Hjalmar Schacht (1877 in Tingleff – 1970) a German economist, banker and German politician
 Jane Schumacher (born 1988 in Tinglev) a Danish team handball player
 Line Vedel Hansen (born 1989) a Danish professional golfer, lives in Tinglev

References

External links
 Aabenraa municipality's official website  - 
 Aabenraa tourist offic  - 
 Municipal statistics - NetBorger Kommunefakta  - 
  Municipal statistics - KMD aka Kommunedata 
 Municipal mergers and neighbors: Eniro new municipalities map 

Former municipalities of Denmark
Cities and towns in the Region of Southern Denmark
Aabenraa Municipality